= Bettannier frères =

French lithographers

The Bettannier frères were two French brothers known for their lithographic work. The brothers, Joseph Bettannier and Edouard Bettannier, lived and worked in Paris in the early 19th century.

Their work is included in the collections of the Musée national des beaux-arts du Québec, National Gallery of Canada, the British Museum, the Metropolitan Museum of Art and the Victoria and Albert Museum
